The Family Crews is a reality television show following the life of comic actor Terry Crews, his wife Rebecca, and their family. The show premiered on BET at 9 p.m. on Sunday, February 21, 2010. The show was renewed for a second season, which premiered on March 6, 2011.

Season 1 (2010)

Episode 1: Will You Marry Me... Again

Episode 2: Mr. Mom/Mrs. Superstar

Episode 3: Burn Baby Burn

Episode 4: Breaking Up Is Hard to Do

Episode 5: So You Wanna Be a Star?

Episode 6: California Dreaming

Episode 7: Crossroads

Episode 8: Flying the Coup

Episode 9: And  the Beat Goes On

Episode 10: Moving On Up

Episode 11: The Future Is Here

Season 2 (2011)

Episode 1: There's No Place Like Home

Episode 2: Jerome Mayberry: Fo' Real

Episode 3: Isaiah Lottery Ticket

Episode 4: Career Day

Episode 5: Mommy's Revenge

Episode 6: If Philly's Rockin, Don't Come Knockin!

Episode 7: We Are Almost There

Episode 8: True Love Waits

Episode 9: Blessed Miley

Episode 10: New York, New York

Episode 11: I'm Coming Out!

External links 
 
 BET Shows - The Family Crews Website

2010 American television series debuts
2010s American reality television series
2011 American television series endings
BET original programming